Aeolochroma metarhodata, the tea-tree emerald, is a moth of the family Geometridae first described by Francis Walker in 1863. It is found in the Australian states of Queensland, New South Wales, and Victoria.

The larvae feed on Leptospermum polygalifolium.

References

Moths described in 1863
Pseudoterpnini
Moths of Australia